The following is a list of MTV Pilipinas winners for Favorite New Artist in a Video.

References

MTV Pilipinas Music Awards